Aframomum luteoalbum is a species of plant in the ginger family, Zingiberaceae. It was first described by Karl Moritz Schumann.

Range
Aframomum luteoalbum is native from Southwest South Sudan to Northwest Tanzania.

References 

luteoalbum